Jan Nederveen Pieterse is a Dutch-born scholar whose work centers on global political economy, development studies and cultural studies. He currently serves as the Duncan and Suzanne Mellichamp Distinguished Professor of Global Studies and Sociology at the University of California, Santa Barbara.

Background 
Jan received B.A. and M.A. degrees from the University of Amsterdam in cultural anthropology, and completed his Ph.D. in social science at the University of Nijmegen in 1988. He has previously held professorships at Maastricht University, University of Illinois Urbana-Champaign, the International Institute of Social Studies, The Hague; University of Cape Coast, Ghana,  the University of Amsterdam and Malaysia National University. In addition, he has served as visiting professor at universities in Argentina, Brazil, China, France, Germany, India, Indonesia, Japan, Pakistan, South Africa, Sri Lanka, Sweden, and Thailand.

Jan is on the editorial boards of Clarity Press and Global-e, and is associate/advisory editor of Development and Change, Third World Quarterly, European Journal of Social Theory, Ethnicities, Third Text, Journal of Social Affairs, Journal of Global Studies in Education, Sociological Analysis, Global Applied Sociology, and Encounters (Zayed University Press). He also edits book series with both Routledge (Emerging Societies) and Palgrave MacMillan (Frontiers of Globalization).

Scholarship 
Nederveen Pieterse has authored 10 books and co-edited 14 others. Several of Pieterse's published works have been translated into more than five languages. Jan works on a variety of themes, ranging from development and globalization to cultural studies. His work concerns multiple regions of the world including Northeast Asia, Southeast Asia, China, the Middle East, Europe and North and Latin America. Jan's current work focuses on new trends in 21st century globalization and the rise of emerging economies. His most recent books are Multipolar Globalization and Coming Home to the Global.

Selected books 
 2017. Multipolar Globalization: Emerging Economies and Development. London, Routledge
 2017. Changing Constellations of Southeast Asia: From Northeast Asia to China, co-edited with Abdul Rahman Embong, and Siew Yean Tham, eds. 2017 London, Routledge.
 2017. China’s Contingencies and Globalization, co-edited with Changgang Guo and Liu Debin. London, Routledge
 2015. Globalization and Culture: Global Mélange. Rowman and Littlefield, third revised edition
 2014. Globalization and Development in East Asia, co-edited with Jongtae Kim. New York, Routledge.
 2013. Brazil Emerging: Inequality and Emancipation, co-edited with Adalberto Cardoso. London, Routledge.
 2011. 21st Century Globalization: Perspectives from the Gulf, co-edited with Habibul Haque Khondker. Abu Dhabi, Zayed University Press.
 2010. Development Theory, 2nd edition. London, Sage.
 2009. Globalization and Emerging Societies: Development and Inequality, Boike Rehbein. Basingstoke, Palgrave Macmillan.
 2009. Is There Hope for Uncle Sam? Beyond the American Bubble. London, Zed Books.
 2007. Ethnicities and Global Multiculture: Pants for an Octopus. Rowman & Littlefield
 2004. Globalization or Empire? New York, Routledge.
 2000. Global Futures: Shaping Globalization. London, Zed Books.
 1998. World Orders in the Making: Humanitarian Intervention and Beyond. London, Palgrave.
 1995. White on Black: Images of Africa and Blacks in Western Popular Culture. Yale UP
 1995. The Decolonization of Imagination,  co-edited with Bhikhu Parekh. London, Zed Books.
 1992. Christianity and Hegemony. Oxford, Berg
 1992. Emancipations, Modern and Postmodern. London, Sage
 1989. Empire and Emancipation: Power and Liberation on a World Scale. New York, Praeger.

Selected Articles and Book Chapters 
 2016 Multipolarity means Thinking Plural: Modernities, in G. Preyer and M. Sussmann, eds. Varieties of Multiple Modernities. Leiden, Brill, 109-121.
 2015 China’s contingencies and globalization, Third World Quarterly 36, 11: 1985-2001.
 2015 What happened to the Miracle Eight? Looking East in the twenty-first century, Canadian Journal of Development Studies 63, 3: 263-282.
 2014 Rethinking Modernity and Capitalism: Add Context and Stir, Sociopedia Colloquium (e-journal)
 2013 What is global studies? Globalizations 10, 4: 499-514 (with Comments & Response)
 2012 Leaking Superpower: WikiLeaks and the contradictions of democracy, Third World Quarterly 33, 10: 1909-1924
 2012 Periodizing globalization: Histories of globalization, New Global Studies 6, 2: 1-25 
 2012 Twenty-first century globalization: A new development era, Forum for Development Studies 39, 1: 1-19 
 2011 Global rebalancing: Crisis and the East-South turn, Development and Change 42, 1: 22-48 
 2009 Representing the rise of the rest as threat: Media and global divides, Global Media and Communication, 5, 2: 1-17
 2007 Global Multiculture, Flexible Acculturation, Globalizations, 4, 1: 65-79 
 1998 My Paradigm or Yours? Alternative Development, Post Development, Reflexive Development          Development and Change, 29, 2: 343-73
 1994 Globalization as Hybridization, International Sociology, 9, 2, 1994: 161-84

Awards 
The JC Ruigrok Award of the Netherlands Society of Sciences, 1990 (for Empire and Emancipation: Power and Liberation on a World Scale. New York, Praeger, 1989)

He co-organized 7 international Global studies conferences across the world (Chicago, Dubai, Busan, Rio, Moscow, New Delhi, Shanghai), which led to publications co-edited with local scholars.

References

Notes 

Living people
Dutch sociologists
Writers from Amsterdam
Radboud University Nijmegen alumni
University of Illinois Urbana-Champaign faculty
Writers about globalization
Year of birth missing (living people)